Barking RFC is an English rugby union team based in Barking, east London and currently play in the ninth tier of the English rugby union league system, Essex 1.

History

Park Modern Old Boys
The club was founded in 1930, under the name of Park Modern Old Boys. In 1926 the Park Modern School in Barking was founded and the headmaster decided that the school would play rugby, despite football being the most popular sport in the area. As a result, the Old Boys team was created four years later and won 16 out of 19 games in its inaugural season.

Barking RFC
Old Boys continued to prosper after the Second World War. In 1974 they were declared no longer an Old Boys team, and so were obliged to change their name to Barking Park RFC, which became Barking RFC in 1976.

Barking were successful upon the introduction of leagues and moved slowly up the league ladder. Jason Leonard, whose total of 119 caps as a prop was the world record from 2004 to 2006, began his club career at Barking. In 1989 Barking opened their current ground at Goresbrook, Dagenham and have remained there since. They reached the National Leagues in 1994. After winning National Division Three South in the 2004–05 season, Barking enjoyed two seasons in National Division Two before being relegated in 2007. The season began with a crushing 63–10 defeat at the hands of newly promoted Mounts Bay, who were eventually crowned champions. This set the tone for a season in which the Eastenders were constantly staving off the threat of relegation. However, Barking survived by the narrowest of margins after defeating the very team who had destroyed them on the opening day and finished the league as champions. The 16–14 win at Goresbrook was enough to send Bristol-based Clifton down by a single point and secure another season of National League rugby for Essex and London's East End.

Comedian and actor Nick Frost, known for his many film and television collaborations with Simon Pegg, is an ex-player.

Honours
 London 3 North East champions: 1987–88
 London 1 champions: 1993–94
 National League 2 South (formerly known as National League 3 South) champions: 2004–05, 2009–10

Current squad

|pos=SR |  name= Stephen Hayes}}
{{rugby squad player | nat=ENG |

{{rugby squad player | nat=ENG

See also
 Essex RFU

External links
 Official website

English rugby union teams
Rugby clubs established in 1930
Sport in the London Borough of Barking and Dagenham
Rugby union clubs in London